Valeriy Legchanov (born 13 February 1980), is a Ukrainian futsal player who plays for Energy Lviv and the Ukraine national futsal team.

References

External links 
UEFA profile

1980 births
Living people
Ukrainian men's futsal players
21st-century Ukrainian people